Mickey Fisher may refer to:
 Mickey Fisher (politician)
 Mickey Fisher (screenwriter)
 Mickey Fisher (basketball)